The Atlantic Gateway is a proposed transport project in Canada. It aims to take an integrated approach in developing transport infrastructure within Atlantic Canada to enhance Canada's ability to capture a larger share of growing trade flows between North America and Asia.

The federal minister responsible for the Atlantic Gateway is Lisa Raitt who took over from Keith Ashfield in July 2013. Peter MacKay had earlier held the portfolio until January 2010.

References

Proposed transport infrastructure in Canada